Urge is a citrus flavored soft drink produced by Coca-Cola Norway that was first introduced in the country in 1996, and later on was released in Denmark and Sweden. It is the predecessor of the American soft drink Surge, which was introduced in the US in 1997. Urge was discontinued in Denmark and Sweden in 2001. In Norway, Urge sales increased greatly over the years reaching a market share near 10% despite receiving no marketing since its initial launch.

Sizes 
Urge was available in Norway in 0.5 L and 1.5 L bottles, and later also in 0.33 L cans, but in Q1 of 1999 the 1.5 L bottles were taken off the market due to unsatisfactory sales. The cans also vanished from the market a few years later, leaving only the 0.5 L bottles.

A massive campaign by the consumers on the internet community Facebook led to the relaunch of the 1.5 L bottle size on 1 September 2008. It has a sugar content of 68 grams per 0.5 L bottle.

In February 2017, due to fan demand, the 0.33 L cans were reintroduced in a multipack of four.

Varieties

Urge Intense
An energy drink variant of Urge. It was launched in 2009 in association with the Facebook group that pressured Coca-Cola to relaunch the 1.5L bottles. Much like with many other energy drinks like Burn and Monster Energy, Urge Intense Triple Rush came in 0.5L cans and has a high caffeine content of 32 mg per 100 mL.

The Urge Intense range was discontinued in 2016.

Urge Uten Sukker
In September 2017, a Zero Sugar version was launched known as Urge Uten Sukker, which like its regular counterpart, was made especially for Norway. This sugar-free variant came in orange-tinted bottles, before switching to the clear ones regular Urge uses.

Nutrient Information

References 

Coca-Cola brands
Products introduced in 1996
Scandinavian culture
Energy drinks